Gerberga of Saxony (c. 913 – 5 May 968/9 or 984?) was a French queen who ruled as regent of France during the minority of her son Lothair in 954–959. She was a member of the Ottonian dynasty.  Her first husband was Gilbert, Duke of Lorraine. Her second husband was Louis IV of France. Contemporary sources describe her as a highly educated, intelligent and forceful political player.

Life

Family
Gerberga was born c. 913. She was the second daughter of Henry the Fowler, King of Germany, and his second wife, Matilda (after Hedwig of Saxony, three years her senior). Her older brother was Otto I of Germany.

First marriage
In 929, Gerberga married her first husband, Gilbert, Duke of Lorraine. They had four children:
 Alberade of Lorraine (b. about 929); married Renaud (originally as Ragenold), a Viking chieftain who became the Count of Roucy. 
 Henry, Duke of Lorraine (b. about 932).
 Gerberge of Lorraine (b. about 935); married Adalbert I of Vermandois.
 Wiltrude (b. about 937).

Jocundus, a Lotharingian chronicler writing in the 1070s, recorded that Gerberga was the driving force behind Gilbert's decision to support her younger brother Henry when he rebelled against her older brother Otto I c. 936. Gilbert was defeated by Otto I in 939 at the Battle of Andernach and, while trying to escape, drowned in the Rhine.

Second marriage
When Gilbert died, Gerberga was about 26 years old. She married secondly Louis IV of France in 939. They were parents to eight children:
 Lothair of France (941–986).
 Matilda (b. about 943); married Conrad of Burgundy.
 Hildegarde (b. about 944).
 Carloman (b. about 945).
 Louis (b. about 948).
 Charles, Duke of Lower Lorraine (953–993).
 Alberade (b. before 953).
 Henry (b. about 953).

Widowhood

As regent
Louis IV died on 10 September 954. At this time, his son and heir with Gerberga, Lothair of France, was only thirteen, and she therefore became regent during his minority. As regent, Gerberga took action to ensure that Lothar could succeed his father.  She reached an agreement with her brother-in-law Hugh the Great, who had been an adversary to Lothair's father.  In exchange for supporting Lothair's rule, Hugh was given rule over Aquitaine and much of Burgundy. Gerberga did not seek the support of her brother, Emperor Otto I, because the interference of the East-Frankish emperor in West-Frankish affairs would have placed the West-Frankish kingdom in a weak position politically, and angered the West-Frankish nobles.

After the death of Hugh the Great in 956, Gerberga and her sister Hadwig (who was Hugh's widow) were the heads of the two most powerful dynasties in West Francia. Along with their brother, Bruno, who was both archbishop of Cologne and duke of Lotharingia, Gerberga and Hadwig ruled the kingdom, until Lothair came of age.

As abbess
In 959, after Lothair had come of age, Gerberga became abbess of the Benedictine monastery of Notre Dame in Soissons. Nevertheless, she remained politically active. In 961 she was involved in choosing the new archbishop of Reims, Odalric. In 965 she was present at the imperial court in Cologne, when her son Lothair married Emma of Italy, the step-daughter of her brother Emperor Otto I.

Death
There is some debate about when Gerberga died. She is last documented in May 968. Since necrology records indicate that she died on 5 May, her date of death is often given as 968 or 969. The death date of 5 May 968 is not possible since Gerberga was still alive on 17 May 968 so her death date could only be in 969 or later. Some maintain that Gerberga did not die until 984. She is buried in the Abbey of Saint-Remi in Reims, Champagne.

References

Sources
Bouchard, Constance Brittain, Those of My Blood: Constructing Noble Families in Medieval Francia (University of Pennsylvania Press, 2001).
"Women in power 750-1000" from Guide2womenleaders.com, last accessed January 13, 2007
Jocundus, Translatio sancti Servatii Tungrensis episcopi et miracula, ed. R. Koepke, MGH SS 12 (Hannover, 1856), accessible online at: Monumenta Germaniae Historica
W. Glocker, Die Verwandten  der Ottonen und ihre Bedeutung in der Politik. Studien zur Familienpolitik und zur Genealogie des sächsischen Kaiserhauses (1989).
D. Schwennicke, Europäische Stammtafeln Neue Folge Band I. 1
A. Thiele, Erzählende genealogische Stammtafeln zur europäischen Geschichte Band I, Teilband 1

External links
Medieval Lands Project
  (in German)
Gerberga von Sachsen (in German)

|-

910s births
10th-century deaths
Year of birth uncertain
Year of death uncertain
Carolingian dynasty
Ottonian dynasty
10th-century French nuns
10th-century Saxon people
German female regents
10th-century women rulers
Christian abbesses
French queens consort
Frankish queens consort
Burials at the Royal Abbey of Saint-Remi
Women from the Carolingian Empire
10th-century German women
Daughters of kings
Queen mothers
Remarried royal consorts